The following are the national records in athletics in Costa Rica maintained by its national athletics federation: Federación Costarricense de Atletismo (FECOA). So far FECOA maintains an official list only in outdoor events.

Outdoor

Key to tables:

+ = en route to a longer distance

h = hand timing

A = affected by altitude

OT = oversized track (> 200m in circumference)

Men

Women

Indoor

Men

Women

Notes

References
General
Costa Rican Outdoor Records – Men 13 June 2021 updated
Costa Rican Outdoor Records – Women 27 June 2021 updated
World Athletics Statistic Handbook 2018: National Indoor Records
Specific

External links
 FECOA web site

Costa Rica
Records
Athletics
Athletics